Hamiltonian truncation is a numerical method used to study quantum field theories (QFTs) in  spacetime dimensions. Hamiltonian truncation is an adaptation of the Rayleigh–Ritz method from quantum mechanics. It is closely related to the exact diagonalization method used to treat spin systems in condensed matter physics. The method is typically used to study QFTs on spacetimes of the form , specifically to compute the spectrum of the Hamiltonian along . A key feature of Hamiltonian truncation is that an explicit ultraviolet cutoff  is introduced, akin to the lattice spacing a in lattice Monte Carlo methods. Since Hamiltonian truncation is a nonperturbative method, it can be used to study strong-coupling phenomena like spontaneous symmetry breaking.

Principles

Energy cutoff 

Local quantum field theories can be defined on any manifold. On such a manifold we can take time to run along , such that energies are conserved. Solving such a QFT amounts to finding the spectrum and eigenstates of the Hamiltonian H, which is difficult or impossible to do analytically. Hamiltonian truncation provides a strategy to compute the spectrum of H to arbitrary precision. The idea is that many QFT Hamiltonians can be written as the sum of "free" part  and an "interacting" part that describes interactions (for example a  term or a Yukawa coupling), schematically

where V can be written as the integral of a local operator  over M. There may be multiple interaction terms , but that case generalizes straightforwardly from the case with a single interaction . Hamiltonian truncation amounts to the following recipe:

Normalize these eigenstates such that . Let  be the number of low-energy states.
 Compute the Hamiltonian explicitly restricted to these low-energy states. The result will be a matrix of size , explicitly  with 
 Compute the energies and eigenstates of the finite matrix , obeying .

In a UV-finite quantum field theory, the resulting energies  have a finite limit as the cutoff  is taken to infinity, so at least in principle the exact spectrum of the Hamiltonian can be recovered. In practice the cutoff  is always finite, and the procedure is performed on a computer.

Range of validity 

For a given cutoff ,  Hamiltonian truncation has a finite range of validity, meaning that cutoff errors become important when the coupling g is too large. To make this precise, let's take R to be the rough size of the manifold M, that is to say that

up to some c-number coefficient. If the deformation V is the integral of a local operator of dimension , then the coupling g will have mass dimension , so the redefined coupling

is dimensionless.
  : perturbation theory is valid. Generically, perturbation theory is either asymptotic or it converges up to some value .
 : perturbation theory is no longer reliable, but the truncated energies  provide a good approximation to their continuum values for reasonable values of the cutoff .
In practice, this regime is not accessible. This is an avatar of the orthogonality catastrophe.

Truncation errors and ultraviolet divergences 

There are two intrinsic but related issues with Hamiltonian truncation:
 Even when the continuum limit  exists, we only have access to cutoff data  for a range of finite values of the cutoff.

The first case is due to ultraviolet divergences of the quantum field theory in question. In this case, cutoff-dependent counterterms must be added to the Hamiltonian H in order to obtain a physically meaningful result. In order to understand the second problem, one can perform perturbative computations to understand the continuum limit analytically.

Let us spell this out using an example. We have in mind a perturbation of the form gV with

where  is a local operator. Suppose that we want to compute the first corrections to the vacuum energy due to V. In Rayleigh–Schrödinger perturbation theory, we know that

where

where the sum runs over all states  other than the vacuum  itself. Whether this integral converges or not depends on the large-E behavior of the spectral density . In turn, this depends on the short-distance behavior of the two-point correlation function of the operator . Indeed, we can write

where  evolves in Euclidean time in the interaction picture.
Hence the large-E behavior of the spectral density encodes the short-time behavior of the  vacuum correlator, where both x,y are integrated over space. The large-E scaling can be computed in explicit theories; in general it goes as

where  is the scaling or mass dimension of the operator   and c is some constant.
There are now two possibilities, depending on the value of :
 If , the truncated Casimir energy  diverges in the continuum limit. In this case, a cutoff-dependent counterterm must be added to H in order to cancel this divergence.
The truncation error can be estimated to be

A similar analysis applies to cutoff errors in excited states and at higher orders in perturbation theory.

Example of the massive scalar  theory

Quantization 

As an example, we can consider a massive scalar field  on some spacetime , where M is compact (possibly having a boundary). The total metric can be written as

Let's consider the action

The g=0 theory can be canonically quantized, which endows the field  with a mode decomposition

where the creation and annihilation operators obey canonical commutation relations . The single-particle energies  and the mode functions  depend on the spatial manifold M. The Hamiltonian at t=0 is then given by

Hamiltonian truncation 

The Hilbert space of the  theory is the Fock space of the modes . That is to say that there exists a vacuum state  obeying  for all n, and on top of that there are single- and multi-particle states.

where the  can take values in the integers: .
Such a state has energy

so finding a basis of low-energy states amounts to finding all tuples  obeying . Next, the matrix elements  can be computed explicitly using the canonical commutation relations. Finally, the explicit Hamiltonian  has to be diagonalized.

The resulting spectra can be used to study precision physics. The continuous phase transition between these two phases can also be analyzed, in which case the spectrum and eigenstates of H contain information about the conformal field theory of the Ising universality class.

Special cases

Truncated Conformal Space Approach 

The truncated conformal space approach (TCSA) is a version of the Hamiltonian truncation that applies to perturbed conformal field theories. This approach was introduced by Yurov and Al. Zamolodchikov in 1990
and has become a standard ingredient used to study two-dimensional QFTs. The d-dimensional version of TCSA was first studied in 2014.

A RG flow emanating from a conformal field theory (CFT) is described by an action

where  is a scalar operator in the CFT of scaling dimension . At large distances, such theories are strongly coupled. It is convenient to study such RG flows on the cylinder , taking the sphere to have radius R and endowing the full space with coordinates . The reason is that the unperturbed (g=0) theory admits a simple description owing to radial quantization. Schematically, states  on the cylinder are in one-to-one correspondence with local operators  inserted at the origin of flat space:

where  is the CFT vacuum state. The Hamiltonian on the cylinder is precisely the dilatation operator D of the CFT: the unperturbed energies are given by

where  is the scaling dimension of the operator . Finally, the matrix elements of the deformation V

are proportional to OPE coefficients  in the original CFT.

Lightcone truncation methods 

Real-time QFTs are often studied in lightcone coordinates

Although the spectrum of the lightcone Hamiltonian  is continuous, it is still possible to compute certain observables using truncation methods. The most commonly used scheme, used when the UV theory is conformal, is known as lightcone conformal truncation (LCT). Notably, the spatial manifold M is non-compact in this case, unlike the equal-time quantization described previously. See also the page for light-front computational methods, which describes related computational setups.

Numerical implementation 

Hamiltonian truncation computations are normally performed using a computer algebra system, or a programming language like Python or C++.

The number of low-energy states  tends to grow rapidly with the UV cutoff, and it is common to perform Hamiltonian truncation computations taking into account several thousand states. Nonetheless, one is often only interested in the first O(10) energies and eigenstates of H. Instead of diagonalizing the full Hamiltonian explicitly (which is numerically very costly), approximation methods like Arnoldi iteration and the Lanczos algorithm are commonly used.

In some cases, it is not possible to orthonormalize the low-energy states , either because this is numerically expensive or because the underlying Hilbert space is not positive definite. In that case, one has to solve the generalized eigenvalue problem

In practice, it is important to keep track of the symmetries of the theory, that is to say all generators  that satisfy . There are two types of symmetries in Hamiltonian truncation:
 Global symmetries, for instance the  symmetry  in  theory.
 Symmetries of the spatial manifold M, for instance the orthogonal group  when .
When all states are organized in symmetry sectors with respect to the  the Hamiltonian is block diagonal, so the effort required to diagonalize H is reduced.

References 

Quantum field theory
Quantum mechanics